Perception was a video game developer founded in Sydney, Australia. The company released 2 games in the arcade (coin-op) market, Thunderboats, and Top Down Racer. In late 2003, the company began working on a video game for the PC and console platforms based on the tv series Stargate SG-1 which the company had licensed from MGM Studios. The company had staff based in Sydney, Melbourne and Vienna.

History 
Perception began in 1995 as a small animation and sound studio, but by 1998 had expanded into the video game market. Between 1998 and 2004, two products were developed primarily for the coin-op arcade market; Thunderboats and Top Down Racer. Thunderboats was an early title developed specifically for the 3DFX Voodoo3D series of 3D video cards, allowing for fully 3D water and wake effects. Thunderboats was signed by EA Sports to be released for PC, PSX and N64 in 1998, but development ceased. Top Down Racer was intended as a (then) modern-day version of the arcade classic, Super Sprint, with boats, cars and $WD's.

In 2004, the company successfully negotiated with MGM entertainment to develop a new video game based on the Stargate television series. The game's publisher, Austrian based JoWOoD was funding the game, but experienced financial difficulties, which delayed the project. Unfortunately, this ultimately led to MGM terminating its licensing agreement with Perception and all development staff were made redundant.

In November 2007, Perception announced that they were suing their former publisher for damages.

Games
 Stargate SG-1: The Alliance
 Thunderboats
 Top Down Racer

See also

List of companies of Australia

External links
 Thunderboats at IGN
 Perception at IGN

Defunct video game companies of Australia
Video game companies established in 1995
Video game development companies